Dichromorpha is a genus of grasshoppers of the family Acrididae.

Species

Dichromorpha australis (Bruner, 1900)
Dichromorpha elegans (Morse, 1896)
Dichromorpha prominula (Bruner, 1904)
Dichromorpha viridis (Scudder, 1862)

References

Acrididae genera
Gomphocerinae